GURPS Horror is a sourcebook for GURPS. The first edition was published in 1987.

Contents
GURPS Horror is a GURPS supplement featuring rules for including horror in games, including guidelines for character creation and backgrounds for adventures.

The second edition of GURPS Horror adds guidelines on how to play using historical periods, and information on the Illuminati.

Publication history
The first edition of GURPS Horror was written by Scott Haring, featuring a cover by Michael Whelan, and was published by Steve Jackson Games in 1987 as a 96-page book.

The second edition of GURPS Horror was written by Scott Haring and J.M. Caparula and published in 1990 as a 128-page book.

GURPS Horror was one of the broad genre books that was published after the GURPS Basic Set.

The Third Edition was released in 2002, with content added by Kenneth Hite influenced by his preceding role-playing game Nightmares of Mine. The Fourth Edition was released in 2011.

Reception
Ken Rolston reviewed the first edition of GURPS Horror for Dragon magazine #138 (October 1988). Rolston wrote in his conclusion: "The GURPS system works better than COC'''s basic role-playing system for tactical role-playing, and those already playing GURPS games will find the GURPS Horror game's mechanics useful. For a heroic supernatural campaign similar in tone to most fantasy role-playing campaigns (with the PCs as fearless crusaders against evil occult horrors), this supplement is a suitable system."

Rick Swan reviewed the second edition of GURPS Horror for Dragon magazine #186 (October 1992). Swan writes in his conclusion: "Though sketchy in places and unfocused as a whole, the GURPS Horror game still stands as the best horror overview on the market. Referees who enjoy creating their own adventures will find plenty of raw material here, particularly in the Cabal chapter and creature rosters. However, nothing crucial has been added in the new version, certainly nothing that automatically renders the first edition obsolete. Owners of the first edition can safely skip the second and spend their money elsewhere, perhaps on a copy of the GURPS Psionics game."GURPS Horror'', Fourth Edition won the 2012 Silver Ennie Award for "Best Supplement" and "Best Writing".

See also
List of GURPS books

References

External links
Most recent published errata for the 1st edition

ENnies winners
GURPS 1st/2nd edition
GURPS 3rd edition
GURPS 4th edition
Horror
Horror role-playing games
Role-playing game supplements introduced in 1987